The Capri Cyclone, also referred to as the Cyclone 13 or just the Cyclone, is an American sailing dinghy that was designed by Frank V. Butler as a one-design racer and first built in 1970.

Production
The design was built by the Capri Yachts division of Catalina Yachts in the United States. A total of 2,400 boats were completed, but it is now out of production.

Design
The Capri Cyclone is a recreational sailboat, built predominantly of fiberglass with foam flotation. It has a stayed catboat rig with a short forestay, aluminum spars, a flexible mast and a loose-footed mainsail with mid-boom sheeting and a full cockpit width mainsheet traveler. The hull design features a spooned raked stem, a vertical transom, a transom-hung fiberglass rudder controlled by a tiller and a retractable fiberglass daggerboard. There is a forward compartment for stowage, closed by a hatch. The boat displaces  and is capable of planing.

The manufacturer not only approved of the modification, but offered it free of charge.

For sailing the design is equipped with a self-bailing cockpit, hiking straps, an outhaul, Cunningham and a boom vang. Factory options included a sail window, a kick-up rudder and a two-piece mast to ease ground transport.

The design has a Portsmouth Yardstick racing average handicap of 96.3 and is normally raced by a crew of one or two sailors.

Operational history
In a 1994 review Richard Sherwood wrote that the Cyclone is "a planing dinghy with a bendy mast. There is an unusually short forestay. For ease of cartopping, the mast may be ordered in two pieces. Both the centerboard and the rudder are fiberglass. A beaching rudder is available as an option."

See also
List of sailing boat types

References

External links
 A comprehensive web site including a lot of details, and a fleet roster

Dinghies
1970s sailboat type designs
Sailboat types built by Catalina Yachts
Sailboat type designs by Frank Butler